Frugalware Linux has been a general-purpose Linux distribution designed for intermediate users who are familiar with command-line operations. Early versions were based on Slackware, but it later became an independently developed distribution. Frugalware made use of the Pacman package management system from Arch Linux.

History 
Frugalware was founded in 2004 by Miklós Vajna. He considered Slackware's package manager pkgtools too slow, and wanted to rewrite it in C. He was told that it would never be accepted by Slackware, so Vajna started to think about founding a separate Linux distribution. He replaced Slackware's original init scripts and build system, and added Pacman, the package manager from Arch Linux. As a result, Frugalware was born.

Package management 
Since version 0.6 Frugalware has used the Pacman-G2 package manager. It is a fork of a CVS version of the complete rewrite of Pacman by Aurelien Foret, which was not officially released at the time. Previously Frugalware used a modified version of the older, monolithic Pacman by Judd Vinet.

Frugalware's packages' extension is .fpm. The packages are archives that are compressed using xz.

Repoman is a tool to compile source packages and automatically create and install closed-source packages. With Repoman, the user can also download all packages' buildscript and recompile them with specific build options. The build options can be changed by editing a configuration file. The first Frugalware release that had Repoman was Frugalware 0.3pre1.

Branches 
Frugalware has a -current and a -stable branch. The -current branch is updated daily, and the -stable branch gets updated every 6 months.

Architectures 
From the official web site, 2012: "Frugalware currently supports x86 (Pentium Pro or higher) and x86_64 (k8, aka. amd64) platforms".

Releases 

All the Frugalware releases except "Genesis" have been named after planets in science fiction books by Isaac Asimov.

References

Further reading

External links 

 
 

KDE
Pacman-based Linux distributions
Slackware
X86-64 Linux distributions
Linux distributions